Isabel Ortega Ventura (born, 20 December 1954) is a Bolivian Aymara-Quechua politician. She was born in 1954 in Ventilla Pongo, Cercado Province, Oruro Department. She worked as a farmer and was involved in union activities. Ortega Ventura has also held leadership positions in Federación Sindical Originaria Regional de Caracollo. In 2010, she became the Vice Minister of Justice for Indigenous People.

References

1954 births
Living people
People from Cercado Province (Oruro)
Bolivian politicians
21st-century Bolivian politicians
21st-century Bolivian women politicians